Šventupys  is a river of  Akmenė district municipality, Šiauliai County, northern Lithuania.

Rivers of Lithuania
Akmenė District Municipality
Venta River basin